In mathematics the Korovkin approximation is a convergence statement in which the approximation of a function is given by a certain sequence of functions. In practice a continuous function can be approximated by polynomials. With Korovkin approximations one comes a convergence for the whole approximation with examination of the convergence of the process at a finite number of functions. The Korovkin approximation is named after Pavel Korovkin.

References

Computational mathematics
Functional analysis